Terence Kelly (born June 12, 1944) is a Canadian film, television and stage actor.

Education 
Kelly is an early graduate of the National Theatre School of Canada.

Career 
Kelly work worked artistic director of the White Rock Summer Theatre in White Rock, British Columbia.

He also had recurring roles in The Beachcombers, The Odyssey, Higher Ground, Tom Stone, Da Vinci's Inquest and Da Vinci's City Hall, made guest appearances on The X-Files, Bordertown, Mom P.I., Neon Rider, The Commish and 21 Jump Street. He also appeared in the films Beyond the Stars, The Mermaid Chair, Jane's House, Chautauqua Girl,The Sisterhood of the Traveling Pants and Finding Father Christmas.

In 1987, for his roles as RCMP officer Sgt. Wilkes in Red Serge, he was nominated for a Gemini Award in the Best Actor in a Dramatic Program or Mini-Series category at the 2nd Gemini Awards. He played Grandpa Heffley in the Diary of a Wimpy Kid series.

Filmography

Film

Television

References

External links
 

1944 births
Living people
Canadian male film actors
Canadian male stage actors
Canadian male television actors
Canadian theatre directors